Tisha B'Av ( Tīšʿā Bəʾāv;) is an annual fast day in Judaism, on which a number of disasters in Jewish history occurred, primarily the destruction of both Solomon's Temple by the Neo-Babylonian Empire and the Second Temple by the Roman Empire in Jerusalem.

Tisha B'Av marks the end of the three weeks between dire straits and is regarded as the saddest day in the Jewish calendar, and it is thus believed to be a day which is destined for tragedy.  Tisha B'Av falls in July or August in the Gregorian calendar.

The observance of the day includes five prohibitions, most notable of which is a 25-hour fast. The Book of Lamentations, which mourns the destruction of Jerusalem, is read in the synagogue, followed by the recitation of kinnot, liturgical dirges that lament the loss of the Temples and Jerusalem. As the day has become associated with remembrance of other major calamities which have befallen the Jewish people, some kinnot also recall events such as the murder of the Ten Martyrs by the Romans, expulsions from England, Spain and elsewhere, massacres of numerous medieval Jewish communities during the Crusades, and the Holocaust.

History

Five calamities

According to the Mishnah (Taanit 4:6), five specific events occurred on the ninth of Av that warrant fasting:

 The Twelve Spies sent by Moses to observe the land of Canaan returned from their mission. Only two of the spies, Joshua and Caleb, brought a positive report, while the others spoke disparagingly about the land. The majority report caused the Children of Israel to cry, panic and despair of ever entering the "Promised Land". For this, they were punished by God that their generation would not enter the land. The midrash quotes God as saying about this event, "You cried before me pointlessly, I will fix for you [this day as a day of] crying for the generations", alluding to the future misfortunes which occurred on the same date.
 The First Temple built by King Solomon was destroyed by Nebuchadnezzar in 586 BCE, and the population of the Kingdom of Judah was sent into the Babylonian exile. According to the Bible, the First Temple's destruction began on the 7th of Av (2 Kings 25:8) and continued until the 10th (Jeremiah 52:12). According to the Talmud, the actual destruction of the Temple began on the Ninth of Av, and it continued to burn throughout the Tenth of Av.
 The Second Temple built by Ezra and Nehemiah was destroyed by the Romans in 70 CE, scattering the people of Judea and commencing the Jewish exile from the Holy Land.
 The Romans subsequently crushed Bar Kokhba's revolt and destroyed the city of Betar, killing over 500,000 Jewish civilians (approximately 580,000) on 4 August 135 CE.
 Following the Bar Kokhba revolt, Roman commander Quintus Tineius Rufus plowed the site of the Temple in Jerusalem and the surrounding area, in 135 CE.

Other calamities
Over time, Tisha B'Av has come to be a Jewish day of mourning, not only for these events, but also for later tragedies which occurred on or near the 9th of Av. References to some of these events appear in liturgy composed for Tisha B'Av (see below).

The First Crusade officially commenced on 15 August 1096 (Av 24, AM 4856), killing 10,000 Jews in its first month and destroying Jewish communities in France and the Rhineland.
The Jews were expelled from England on 18 July 1290 (Av 9, AM 5050).
The Jews were expelled from France on 22 July 1306 (Av 10, AM 5066).
The Jews were expelled from Spain on 31 July 1492 (Av 7, AM 5252).
Germany entered World War I on 1–2 August 1914 (Av 9–10, AM 5674), which caused massive upheaval in European Jewry and whose aftermath led to the Holocaust.
 On 2 August 1941 (Av 9, AM 5701), SS commander Heinrich Himmler formally received approval from the Nazi Party for "The Final Solution." As a result, the Holocaust began during which almost one third of the world's Jewish population perished.
On 23 July 1942 (Av 9, AM 5702), began the mass deportation of Jews from the Warsaw Ghetto, en route to Treblinka.
The AMIA bombing, of the Jewish community center in Buenos Aires, killed 85 and injured 300 on 18 July 1994 (10 Av, AM 5754).
The 2005 Israeli disengagement from Gaza.

While the Holocaust spanned a number of years, most religious communities use Tisha B'Av to mourn its 6,000,000 Jewish victims, in addition to or instead of the secular Holocaust Memorial Days. On Tisha B'Av, communities which otherwise do not modify the traditional prayer liturgy have added the recitation of special kinnot related to the Holocaust.

Related observances
In connection with the fall of Jerusalem, three other fast-days were established at the same time as the Ninth Day of Av: these were the Tenth of Tevet, when the siege of Jerusalem by the Babylonians began; the Seventeenth of Tammuz, when the first breach was made in the wall by the Romans; and the Third of Tishrei, known as the Fast of Gedaliah, the day when Gedaliah was assassinated in the time of the Babylonians following the destruction of the First Temple. The three weeks leading up to Tisha B'Av are known as The Three Weeks, while the nine days leading up to Tisha B'Av are known as The Nine Days.

Laws and customs

Tisha B'Av falls in July or August in the Gregorian calendar. This last occurred in 2022, and will next occur in 2029. No outward signs of mourning intrude upon the normal Sabbath, although normal Sabbath eating and drinking end just before sunset Saturday evening, rather than nightfall.

The fast lasts about 25 hours, beginning just before sunset on the preceding evening lasting until nightfall the next day. In addition to fasting, other pleasurable activities are also forbidden.

Main prohibitions
Tisha B'Av bears a similar stringent nature to that of Yom Kippur. In addition to the length of the fast which lasts about 25 hours, beginning just before sunset on the eve of Tisha B'Av and ends at nightfall the following day, Tisha B'Av also shares the following five prohibitions:

No eating or drinking;
No washing or bathing;
No application of creams or oils;
No wearing of (leather) shoes;
No marital (sexual) relations.

These restrictions are waived in the case of health issues but a competent posek, a rabbi who decides Jewish Law, must be consulted. For example, those who are seriously ill will be allowed to eat and drink. On other fast days almost any medical condition may justify breaking the fast; in practice, since many cases differ, consultation with a rabbi is often necessary. Ritual washing up to the knuckles is permitted. Washing to cleanse dirt or mud from one's body is also permitted.

Additional customs

Study of the Torah is forbidden on Tisha B'Av (as it is considered an enjoyable activity), except for the study of distressing texts such as the Book of Lamentations, the Book of Job, portions of Jeremiah and chapters of the Talmud that discuss the laws of mourning and those that discuss the destruction of the Temple.

In synagogue, prior to the commencement of the evening services, the parochet (which normally covers and adorns the Torah Ark) is removed or drawn aside, lasting until the Mincha prayer service.

According to the Rema it is customary to sit on low stools or on the floor, as is done during shiva, from the meal immediately before the fast (the seudah hamafseket) until midday (chatzot hayom) of the fast itself.  It is customary to eat a hard boiled egg dipped in ashes, and a piece of bread dipped into ashes, during this pre-fast meal. The Beit Yosef rules that the custom to sit low to the ground extends past mid-day, until one prays Mincha (the afternoon prayer).

If possible, work is avoided during this period. Electric lighting may be turned off or dimmed, and kinnot recited by candlelight. Some sleep on the floor or modify their normal sleeping routine, by sleeping without a pillow (or with one fewer pillow than usual), for instance. People refrain from greeting each other or sending gifts on this day. Old prayer-books and Torah scrolls are often buried on this day.

The custom is to not put on tefillin for morning services (Shacharit) of Tisha b'Av, and not a talit, rather only wear the personal talit kattan without a blessing. At Mincha services tzitzit and tefilin are worn, with proper blessings prior to donning them.

End of fast
Although the fast ends at nightfall, according to tradition the First Temple continued burning throughout the night and for most of the following day, the tenth of Av. It is therefore customary to maintain all restrictions of the nine days through midday (chatzos) of the following day.

When Tisha B'Av falls on a Saturday, and is therefore observed on Sunday, the 10th of Av, it is not necessary to wait until midday Monday to end restrictions of the nine days.  However, one refrains from involvement in activity that would be considered "joyous", such as eating meat, drinking wine, listening to music, and saying the "shehecheyonu" blessing, until Monday morning.  One can wash laundry and shave immediately after the end of a delayed Tisha B'Av.

When Tisha B'Av begins on Saturday night, the Havdalah ritual is postponed by 24 hours, as one could not drink the accompanying wine.  One says Attah Chonantanu in the Saturday night Shemoneh Esrei prayer, and/or says Baruch Hamavdil, thus ending Shabbat. A blessing is made on the candle Saturday night. After Tisha B'Av ends on Sunday evening, the Havdalah ceremony is performed with wine (without candle or spices).

The laws of Tisha B'Av are recorded in the Shulchan Aruch Orach Chayim 552–557.

Prayer service

Scriptural readings

The scroll of Eicha (Lamentations) is read in synagogue during the evening services.

In many Sephardic congregations the Book of Job is read on the morning of Tisha B'Av.

Those called to the Torah reading on Tisha B'Av are not given the usual congratulations for this honor. There is also a tradition that those who were called to read from the Torah or Haftarah in the Tisha B'Av morning service are also called to read in the afternoon service, because the morning readings are filled with calamity and the afternoon readings contain words of consolation.

Kinnot

In addition, most of the morning is spent chanting or reading Kinnot, most bewailing the loss of the Temples and the subsequent persecutions, but many others referring to post-exile disasters. These later kinnot were composed by various poets (often prominent rabbis) who had either suffered in the events mentioned or relate received reports. Important kinnot were composed by Elazar ha-Kalir and Rabbi Judah ha-Levi. After the Holocaust, kinnot were composed by the German-born Rabbi Shimon Schwab (in 1959, at the request of Rabbi Joseph Breuer) and by Rabbi Solomon Halberstam, leader of the Bobov Hasidim (in 1984). Since Israel's unilateral disengagement from Gaza, some segments of the Religious Zionist community have begun to recite kinnot to commemorate the expulsion of Jewish settlers from Gush Katif and the northern West Bank on the day after Tisha B'Av, in 2005.

Nachem
A paragraph that begins Nahem ("Console...") is added to the conclusion of the blessing Boneh Yerushalayim ("Who builds Jerusalem") recited during the Amidah (for Ashkenazim, only at the Mincha service). The prayer elaborates the mournful state of the Temple and city of Jerusalem. The concluding signature of the blessing is also extended to say "Blessed are You, O Lord, Who consoles Zion and builds Jerusalem."

Various Modern Orthodox and Conservative rabbis have proposed amending Nachem, as its wording no longer reflects the existence of a rebuilt Jerusalem under Israeli sovereignty. Chief Rabbi Shlomo Goren, for example, issued a revised wording of the prayer and Rabbi Hayim David HaLevi proposed putting the prayer's verbs relating to the Temple's destruction into the past tense. However, such proposals have not been widely adopted.

History of the observance

In the long period which is reflected in Talmudic literature the observance of Tisha B'Av assumed a character of constantly growing sadness and asceticism. By the end of the 2nd century or at the beginning of the 3rd, the observance of the day had lost much of its gloom.

The growing strictness in the observance of mourning customs in connection with Tisha B'Av became pronounced in post-Talmudic times, and particularly in one of the darkest periods of Jewish history, from the 15th century to the 18th.

Maimonides (12th century) says that the restrictions as to the eating of meat and the drinking of wine refer only to the last meal before fasting on the Eighth Day of Av, if taken after noon, but before noon anything may be eaten. Rabbi Moses of Coucy (13th century) (aka the Smag) wrote that it is the universal custom to refrain from meat and wine during the whole day preceding the Ninth of Av. Rabbi Joseph Caro (16th century) says some are accustomed to abstain from meat and wine from the beginning of the week in which the Ninth Day of Av falls; and still others abstain throughout the three weeks from the Seventeenth of Tammuz.

A gradual extension of prohibitions can be traced in the abstention from marrying at this season and in other signs of mourning. So Rabbi Moses of Coucy says that some do not use the tefillin ("phylacteries") in the morning of the Ninth Day of Av, a custom which later was universally observed (it is now postponed until the afternoon). In this manner many customs originally designated as marks of unusual piety finally became the rule for mostly all Jews.

Contemporary observance

In Israel

A 2010 poll in Israel revealed that some 22% of Israeli Jews fast on Tisha B'Av, and 52% said they forego recreational activity on this day even though they do not fast. Another 18% of Israeli Jews responded that were recreational spots permissible to be open they would go out on the eve of the fast day, and labeled the current legal status "religious coercion". The last 8% declined to answer.

In Israel, restaurants and places of entertainment are closed on the eve of Tisha B'Av and the following day by law. Establishments that break the law are subject to fines. Outside of Israel, the day is not observed by most secular Jews, as opposed to Yom Kippur, on which many secular Jews fast and go to synagogue. According to halakha, combat soldiers are absolved of fasting on Tisha B'Av on the basis that it can endanger their lives. The latest example of such a ruling was issued during Operation Protective Edge by Israel's Chief Rabbis: Rabbis David Lau and Yitzhak Yosef.

When Menachem Begin became Prime Minister, he wanted to unite all the memorial days and days of mourning on Tisha B'Av, so that Holocaust Remembrance Day and Memorial Day would also fall on this day, but it was not accepted.

In relation to the creation of the State of Israel
As the main focus of the day recalls the destruction of the two Temples in Jerusalem and the subsequent Jewish diaspora, the modern day re-establishment of a Jewish state in the Holy Land has raised various attitudes within Judaism about the appropriateness of fasting and other mourning customs associated with the day. Some observant Jews outside of Orthodoxy curtail some of the mourning customs in recognition of the miracle of the reestablishment of Jewish sovereignty after nearly two thousand years.

Following the Six-Day War, the national religious community viewed Israel's territorial conquests with almost messianic overtones. The conquest of geographical areas with immense religious significance, including Jerusalem, the Western Wall, and the Temple Mount, was seen as portentous; however, only the full rebuilding of the Temple would engender enough reason to cease observing the day as one of mourning and transform it into a day of joy instead.

Other traditions
Classical Jewish sources maintain that the Jewish Messiah will be born on Tisha B'Av, though many explain this idea metaphorically, as the hope for the Jewish Messiah was born on Tisha B'Av with the destruction of the Temple.

See also
 Jewish fast days
 Jewish holiday

Explanatory notes

References

External links

 Peninei Halakha by Rabbi Eliezer Melamed
 What is Tisha B'Av: The Jewish Day of Mourning? video by BimBam
 How We Can Sweeten the Judgments this Tisha B’Av- ShiratMiriam.com 

 
Av observances
Book of Lamentations
Hebrew names of Jewish holy days
Siege of Jerusalem (70 CE)